Northern Exposure is the second mix album by British DJ duo Sasha & John Digweed. Released on 27 September 1996, it is the first in their Northern Exposure series, followed by Northern Exposure 2 in 1997 and Northern Exposure: Expeditions in 1999. There is both a British edition released by Ministry of Sound and an American edition released by Ultra Records in 1997. The British package contains both CDs, whereas the American only has the first disc. In 2013, the album was certified silver in the UK.

Background
The album is a concept album of tracks specially selected and mixed as two different "journeys", the first being the north journey, and the second being the south journey. The DJ duo's following mix albums are also concept albums.

Another version of Northern Exposure was also released as a quadruple vinyl LP in the UK released with the record label of Ministry of Sound. It differs greatly from the CD in that the tracks are not mixed, lacking any DJ-driven transition between tracks. Sasha and Digweed also removed some of the tracks and shuffled the remaining tracks around, to make a new "journey" experience to the listeners. Some tracks are also changed from the North disc to the South disc and vice versa.

Reception
The album reached number 7 initially in the UK Compilation Chart. In The Mix ranked Northern Exposure the 5th best mix album of all time in its list of the top 30 ever, saying it's "considered the pinnacle of Sasha and Digweed’s joint efforts, Northern Exposure confirmed the mastery of both DJs. It’s what every mix-CD wants to be: timeless" Rolling Stone ranked the album as the 25th "greatest EDM album ever", saying "good DJs take you on a journey", Welsh and English icons Sasha and John Digweed (respectively) – whether working together or separately – specialized on rolling the listener through Nineties EDM's most bucolic landscapes. Their best-loved mix CD is a trippy traipse through the verdant world of progressive house, a genre with one foot in the rave and the other somewhere in the great beyond. Track titles like "Raincry" (by God Within) and "Out of Body Experience" (by Rabbit in the Moon) tell you plenty about where this music’s head is at. Also on this nature hike: William Orbit, well before he met Madonna."

Track listing

Charts

Certifications

References

External links
 
 

DJ mix albums
Sasha (DJ) albums
1996 compilation albums